Macarostola coccinea is a moth of the family Gracillariidae. It is known from Tamil Nadu, India.

The larvae feed on Myrtus species. They probably mine the leaves of their host plant.

References

Macarostola
Moths of Asia
Moths described in 1900